さあ、いってみよう (romanised: Sa Itte Miyo) is the fifth album, and second compilation album by Wir sind Helden, released on 14 May 2008 in Japan. The album consisted of a number of tracks from their first three albums (Die Reklamation, Von Hier An Blind, and Soundso) along with a Japanese version of Von Hier An Blind.

The album was the group's first official release in Japan, and included many singles preceding its release, all of which charted in Germany, though only "Sa Itte Miyo" charted in Japan.

Track listing
All songs were written by Wir Sind Helden.

References

Wir sind Helden albums
2008 compilation albums
Virgin Records compilation albums